Gangwon FC (Hangul:강원 FC) is a South Korean football club. Based in Gangwon Province of South Korea, Gangwon FC joined the K League as its 15th club for the 2009 season. The club is sponsored by High1 Resort.

History

Foundation 
Gangwon-do's Governor Kim Jin-sun announced a schedule for the foundation of the 15th professional football club to participate in the K League on April 28, 2008. A committee, the "Foundation of Football Club in Gangwon Preparation Committee", was organized on 18 June 18, 2008 to facilitate the foundation. Preparations had advanced sufficiently that by 17 November 2008, 14 players had joined Gangwon FC in a first nomination. On November 20, 2008, Gangwon FC organized its first full squad, a total of 23 players, including nine players from the 2009 K League draft. Gangwon FC was formally founded on 18 December 2008 in time to enter the 2009 edition of the K-League.

Debut season – 2009 
Gangwon played its first ever K-League match against Jeju United on 8 March 2009, at Gangneung Stadium, winning 1–0 with a decisive goal from Yoon Jun-ha. With this victory, they became the first ever team to win their debut game in K League. Gangwon FC continued their winning start to the season with a further four victories on the trot and causing a sensation in the first half of 2009 K League. Unfortunately Gangwon was unable to maintain their initial success, and by round 19 had fallen into the lower half of the league table. By the conclusion of their first season in the K League, they placed 13th of fifteen clubs.

In the 2009 Korean FA Cup, Gangwon entered the competition in the Round of 32 and defeated their first opponent Incheon Korail FC in a penalty shootout after a 2–2 draw. They then faced the Chunnam Dragons, losing 1–0. In the 2009 K-League Cup, Gangwon finished bottom of their group with only a single win (against Daejeon Citizen).

Difficult period and relegation and promoted 
Gangwon FC had a difficult season in 2010, even though first striker Kim Young-hoo scored 13 goals in the league. The club finished 12th out of 15 clubs. The 2011 season was the worst season since its establishment. Gangwon finished last in the league and the entire team only scored 14 goals in thirty matches.

In the 2012 season, K League imposed a new promotion-relegation structure: bottom two teams in the top-tier league were to be relegated to second division. In the 43rd round, Gangwon managed to remain in the top-tier of K-League by Baek Jong-hwan's decisive goal that won the away game against Seongnam Ilhwa by 1–0. By one point, it avoided relegation.

In the 2013 season of K League Classic, the first historical season in which K League imposed compulsory relegation of bottom three teams and where the team that finished third from the bottom had to play the promotion-relegation playoffs against the champion of 2013 K League Challenge, the second-tier league, Gangwon finished the season in the third place from the bottom inside the relegation zone, subsequently lost to Sangju Sangmu Phoenix over the two-leg relegation playoffs, and was relegated to the K League Challenge.

Head coach Kim Yong-gap voluntarily resigned to take responsibility for the relegation and faced a fairly chaotic stove league, with rumors of coach Lee Eul-yong's promotion to coach, but the club appointed Brazilian coach Arthur Bernardes, who led Jeju United in the 2008-2009 season, to mark the 2014 season. It is the first foreign coach appointment in the K League Challenge.

However, under the 4-2-2-2 formation, which coach Arthur insisted on, Gangwon did not work on the challenge stage, where breakthroughs using wings were the main players, and coach Arthur lost his position as Gangwon won two consecutive games not involved in tactics. In the end, coach Arthur was replaced as of September 18 due to communication problems and management failures as in Jeju, and coach Park Hyo-jin will lead as acting coach for the time being.

To summarize the Arthur system, the philosophy was too stubborn, but there was no immediate effect. According to the players, even if they tried to analyze the opponent's power through videos, coach Arthur refused, saying, "If I focus on my tactics, I don't need that." For reference, it is said that this contributed significantly to the dark age of Jeju, making a legendary 8-2 game during the Jeju period.

He beat Suwon FC in the final match on November 16 to advance to the league's third-place playoff, and his opponent was Gwangju FC, but lost 0:1 with Kim Ho-nam's winning goal at Wonju Stadium, so he will play in the K League Challenge next season.

The positive part is that like Daejeon Citizen, he succeeded in improving his constitution to some extent by having a suitable household. It recorded a surplus for the first time since its foundation, and former president Nam Jong-hyun bragged about releasing his private assets, but actually solved 1.6 billion won out of more than 8 billion won in debt, including debts he had left on the hook. In contrast, Gwangju FC, which succeeded in being promoted, is worried about next year's budget.

In 2016, Gangwon FC is a well-organized soccer and has a short history, but it has shown one of the best performances since its foundation. Of course, there was ups and downs, but it is particularly encouraging that he has consistently shown good performance throughout the season. The point of last season's criticism was that despite the importance of mercenaries, insufficient defense, and poor defense, there was a game in which technical players were appointed and short passes were used more than tough defenders.It's because Kim Sang-ho caused trauma. However, this season, the defense showed excellent defense through organizational power in addition to good skills based on the challenge. However, it was the same last season, but since the weaknesses of physically pushing players remain, it remains to be supplemented that in the classic, stronger physically players will challenge against Gangwon defenders.

Byung-soo ball (2018–2021) 
Halfway through the 2018 season, on 12 August 2018, Kim Byung-soo was appointed as new head coach, leading the club to eighth place in the K League 1. 

The following season, Kim Ji-hyeon was awarded K League Young Player of the Year, as Gangwon finished sixth in the league table. In his first full campaign in 2019, manager Kim Byung-soo earned praise for pushing an entertaining brand of football dubbed "Byung-soo ball." That year, Gangwon led the K League in ball possession, pass attempts, pass completion percentage and forward pass completion percentage, while finishing third in goals. 

Focusing on defensive reinforcements prior to the 2020 season, which was the team's main weaknesses the previous season, Kim Byung-soo recruited Lim Chai-min, Shin Se-gye and Kim Young-bin, among others. With a 2–1 victory at home against Seongnam on 4 October 2020, Gangwon secured the top spot in the Final B and secured survival in the K League 1.

In the lead-up to the 2021 season, players such as Masatoshi Ishida, who had been a mainstay of Suwon the season before, Sin Chang-moo, who was at the heart of Daegu's attack, and national team players Yun Suk-young, Rim Chang-woo and Uzbekistani player Rustam Ashurmatov were recruited. On 21 March 2021, they won their home game against Incheon United with a 2–0 victory to make it their first win in the first six games of the season. On 3 November 2021, in serious danger of suffering relegation to the K League 2 after a humiliating 4–0 loss against Pohang Steelers, Kim Byung-soo was removed from his position. Under his successor, Choi Yong-soo, Gangwon managed to stay up in the top division after beating Daejeon Hana Citizen over two legs in the relegation play-offs.

Players

Current squad

Out on loan

Captains

Youth team 
On 13 September 2010, Gangwon FC U-12 team was established in Gangneung.

On 2 November 2011, Gangwon FC made an agreement with Gangneung Jeil High School (under-18 team) and Jumunjin Middle School (under-15 team).

On February 1, 2021, it was officially announced that Gangwon would be the first fully professional team to found a reserve team set to play in the semi-professional K4 League, in order to give their youth players and/or other registered members of the senior team more playing time. The main condition for them would be to have at least seven out of eleven players in the starting formation aged 23 or younger. Lee Seul-gi, who had previously served as first-team coach for Gangwon, was appointed to be the manager of the new-born U23 squad.

Coaching and medical staff 
Coaching Staff
Manager:  Choi Yong-Soo
Assistant manager:  Kim Seong-Jae
1st team coach:  Kim Hyun-jun, Ha Dae-Seong 
Goalkeeping coach:  Kim Seung-an
Physio:  Jang Seok-min

Executive office
Chairman: Gangwon Province governor
President
  Kim Won-dong (11 November 2008 – 22 July 2011)
  Nam Jong-hyun (22 August 2011 – 19 September 2012)
  Kim Deok-rae (caretaker) (14 December 2012 – 28 May 2013)
  Lim Eun-ju (29 May 2013 – 31 December 2015)

Managers

Season-by-season records 

Key
SF = Semi-final
QF = Quarter-final
R16 = Round of 16
R32 = Round of 32
GS = Group stage

References

External links 

 Gangwon FC official website  

 
K League 2 clubs
Sport in Gangwon Province, South Korea
Association football clubs established in 2008
2008 establishments in South Korea
K League 1 clubs